This is a list of foreign heads of state, heads of government who have visited the Iran, which is classified by the Iranian Ministry of Foreign Affairs as either a state visit, official visit, or working visit.

Scheduled future visits

Summary of visits

Most visited Official

Most visit by Country

See also
List of international trips made by presidents of Iran
List of presidential trips made by Hassan Rouhani

References

Iran diplomacy-related lists
Foreign relations of Iran
History of the foreign relations of Iran
Iran
Iran
Diplomatic conferences in Iran
Iran